DMT Sessions is the thirteenth studio album by Esham.

Release 

The album was released on June 21, 2011. A deluxe edition was announced, which was supposed to feature bonus tracks and a documentary entitled Death of an Indie Label, but the documentary and the bonus track "Comatose" were instead uploaded to Gothom Inc.'s YouTube channel.

Track listing

References

2011 albums
Albums produced by Esham
Esham albums
Reel Life Productions albums